Adiantum pedatum, the northern maidenhair fern or five-fingered fern, is a species of fern in the family Pteridaceae, native to moist forests in eastern North America. Like other ferns in the genus, the name maidenhair refers to the slender, shining black stipes.

Description

Taxonomy
Adiantum pedatum was described by Linnaeus in Species Plantarum in 1753 (the official starting point of modern botanical nomenclature). He referred to earlier descriptions, all based on material from eastern North America. Linnaeus' own herbarium contains one specimen, collected by Pehr Kalm.

Specimens collected in Unalaska and Kodiak Island by Chamisso and Langsdorf were referred to as Adiantum boreale by Presl in 1836, although he did not provide a species description to accompany the name. Ruprecht, in 1845, called the Alaskan material A. pedatum var. aleuticum, and created var. kamtschaticum for material collected in Kamchatka by Carl Merck and Pallas. In 1857, E. J. Lowe noted that Wallich and Cantor had collected the species in northern India, and that material from the western United States ranged as far south as California.  It was one of the many species cited by Asa Gray as disjunct between Japan and both the eastern and western United States. By 1874, Hooker & Baker reported it as present in both Japan and Manchuria.

Several species have been segregated from the former A. pedatum, sensu lato. These include A. aleuticum, A. viridimontanum, A. myriosorum, and A. subpedatum. These all have fronds distinctively bifurcated and with pinnae on only one side.

Habitat
It grows in a variety of habitats, but generally favors soils that are both humus-rich, moist, and well-drained. It grows both in soils and on rock faces and ledges when adequate moisture is present.

References

Bibliography

External links
Adiantum pedatum in the Linnean herbarium

pedatum
Ferns of the United States
Ferns of Canada
Plants described in 1753
Taxa named by Carl Linnaeus
Least concern flora of the United States